Felix Gall (born 27 February 1998 in Nussdorf-Debant) is an Austrian cyclist, who currently rides for UCI WorldTeam .

Major results
2015
 1st  Road race, UCI Junior Road World Championships
 4th Overall Oberösterreich Juniorenrundfahrt
 8th Overall GP Général Patton
2016
 1st Trofeo Guido Dorigo
 3rd Overall Tour du Pays de Vaud 
 6th G.P. Sportivi Sovilla
 9th Overall Course de la Paix Juniors
2018 
 4th Overall Tour de Savoie Mont Blanc
1st  Young rider classification
 6th Overall Grand Prix Priessnitz spa
2019
 1st  Overall Istrian Spring Trophy
1st Stage 2
 9th Overall Circuit des Ardennes
2022
 5th Trofeo Pollença–Port d'Andratx
 6th Overall Tour of the Alps
 10th Trofeo Serra de Tramuntana
2023
 6th Overall Tour des Alpes-Maritimes et du Var
 6th Faun-Ardèche Classic

Grand Tour results timeline

References

External links

1998 births
Living people
Austrian male cyclists
People from Lienz District
Sportspeople from Tyrol (state)